Postage Due is a 1924 American silent comedy film starring Stan Laurel.

Cast
 Stan Laurel – Stan
 James Finlayson – Postal inspector
 George Rowe –  Photographer
 Ena Gregory – Model
 Eddie Baker – Villain
 Dick Gilbert – Villain
 'Tonnage' Martin Wolfkeil – Postal worker
 Jack Ackroyd – Sleeping customer
 William Gillespie – C.W. Lyons, chief postal inspector
 Charlie Hall – Customer
 Mildred Booth
 Sammy Brooks
 Billy Engle
 Al Forbes
 Helen Gilmore
 Fred Karno Jr.
 John B. O'Brien
 Al Ochs

See also
 List of American films of 1924

References

External links

1924 films
1924 comedy films
1924 short films
American silent short films
American black-and-white films
Films directed by George Jeske
Silent American comedy films
American comedy short films
1920s American films